The 1987 Giro d'Italia was the 70th edition of the Giro d'Italia, one of cycling's Grand Tours. The field consisted of 180 riders, and 133 riders finished the race.

By rider

By nationality

References

1987 Giro d'Italia
1987